Tagbu is an ethnic group in the Democratic Republic of the Congo and Sudan. They speak Tagbu, a Ubangian language. Tagbu speakers were estimated to number 17,000 in 2002.

References 

Ethnic groups in Sudan
Ethnic groups in the Democratic Republic of the Congo